Güey (also spelled guey, wey or we) is a word in colloquial Mexican Spanish which is commonly used to refer to any person without using their name. Though more often, and originally only applied to males, it can be used equally for males and females; although women would more commonly use another slang word to refer to another unnamed female person, such as "chava" (young woman) or "vieja" (old lady). It is used roughly the same way as "dude" is used in modern American English. It is derived from the term buey, which refers to an ox, used for meat, sacrifice, or labor. It was used to insult men as cuckolds, because oxen are slow, castrated bulls. The word can be used as an insult, like "fool", although, due to its extremely high frequency of use in a multitude of contexts, it has lost much of its offensive character, becoming a colloquialism.

Use
It is common to use both meanings of the term interchangeably:

 To denote stupidity or ignorance, in expressions like "¡Qué güey soy, se me olvidó el celular!" (I'm such an idiot, I forgot my (cell) phone!) Or "¡No seas güey!'''" (Don't be an idiot!) 
 "¡No güey! ¡Estoy en el Celular!" (No dude! I'm on the phone!); "No güey, no pude ir." (No dude, I couldn't go.)
 To refer to a person whose name is unknown, like "¿Que no es tu hermano aquel güey de camisa roja?" (Isn't the dude with the red shirt your brother?)

In the first case, it is used like the English profanity, "dumbass". In the last two cases, it is used like the American slang term, "dude".
	
Although the word is not always offensive nor an insult between friends, its usage is generally considered uneducated. Thus its usage is limited mostly to friends and trusted acquaintances or among young people. It is considered in poor taste for a teenager or a child to refer to an adult as "güey''," although among adults it is usually used in a common way. The word is used in any social class, being equally accepted and used in all. It is also used in television and radio in popular entertainment, but not in more formal or objective programs, like in the news.

See also
Spanish profanity

External links

References

Mexican slang